Bahabón, a small village and municipality in the province of Valladolid, Spain. It has a population of 198 (2004) and an area of 20.87 km².

Municipalities in the Province of Valladolid